Porcellio hoffmannseggii, commonly called the titan isopod, is a species of woodlouse of the genus Porcellio described in 1833. This very large species is native to Spain and the surrounding regions, particularly in the south.

Porcellio hoffmannseggii should not be confused with Platyarthrus hoffmannseggii, which is also a woodlouse, from the genus Platyarthrus. These two species share the same abbreviated binomial name of P. hoffmannseggii, which is a potential source of confusion. Porcellio hoffmannseggii may be listed with incorrect spelling as Porcellio hoffmannseggi, missing the final 'i'.

Appearance and physical characteristics 

Porcellio hoffmannseggii is considered to be one of the largest terrestrial isopod species, with adults able to grow to be over 1.5" (or 4cm) long. They are typically dark grey or black, with a thin white skirt around the edge of their body. Males of this species have longer uropods than females.

Porcellio hoffmannseggii is a species with multiple identified subspecies. There are current 4 identified subspecies, which are as follows:

Behavior and reproduction 
This species does not conglobate like some of their other Isopod cousins, commonly called pillbugs. It has been observed to guard their young after birth. This species is known to be very territorial for an Isopod, which makes captive culturing more difficult.

Distribution and habitat 

Porcellio hoffmannseggii is common in the Oued Laou region of north-eastern Morocco, when compared to the distribution of other isopod species in the country. In addition to southern Spain and northern Morocco, this species is also native to Portugal.

Compared to other Porcellio species, this species has been observed to prefer drier environments while kept in captivity.

References 

Porcellionidae
Crustaceans described in 1833